Pargas Idrottsförening, or PIF for short, is a sports club based in the city of Pargas, Finland. The club has over 1,500 members and is known, especially for handball, football, and orienteering. It also makes provision for cross-country skiing, floorball, gymnastics, and athletics. The club was founded in 1914 as Pargas Malms Idrottsförening but changed its name to its current title in 1916.

Football

PIF played their first official match in 1916, their opponents being the Kimito based club Wrethalla and the match ended in a 2- 2 draw. In 1994 the club played one season in the Ykkönen, the second tier of the Finnish football system. They also have experienced two other seasons at the same level back in 1939 and 1948. Their records indicate that the club have had three spells in the Kakkonen (Second Division) in 1990–93, 1995 and 2000–06. At the end of the 2006 season they were relegated to the Kolmonen where they currently reside.  In addition, PIF has played two seasons at the highest level in Futsal in Finland,

PIF is the youth club of Finnish international and former Charlton and Rangers player Jonatan "Tintin" Johansson, who has now returned to Turun Palloseura.

Current squad

Season to season

Club Structure
The club runs a large number of teams including a men's team, a ladies' team, a veteran's side (Team 82 Oldboys) and 8 boys and 4 girls junior teams.

A key facility provided by the club is the Aktia Arena, a floodlit all-weather pitch that is 104 x 62 metres (or two junior pitches 62 x 45 metres).  Some matches are played here but the main home venue is at Pajbacka.

2010 season

PIF Men's Team are competing in the Kolmonen administered by the Turku SPL.  This is the fourth highest tier in the Finnish football system.  In 2009 PIF finished in eleventh position in their Kolmonen section.

Orienteering
Pargas won the women's relay in Tiomila in 1999. The orienteering section was founded in 1945.

References and sources
Official Club Website
Official Football Club Website
Finnish Wikipedia
Suomen Cup
Pargas IF Facebook

Footnotes

Football clubs in Finland
Orienteering clubs in Finland
Association football clubs established in 1914
Pargas
1914 establishments in Finland